Toshinobu is a masculine Japanese given name.

Possible writings
Toshinobu can be written using different combinations of kanji characters. Here are some examples: 

敏信, "agile, to believe"
敏伸, "agile, to extend"
敏延, "agile, to extend"
俊信, "talented, to believe"
俊伸, "talented, to extend"
俊延, "talented, to extend"
寿信, "long life, to believe"
寿伸, "long life, to extend"
寿延, "long life, to extend"
利信, "benefit, to believe"
利伸, "benefit, to extend"
利延, "benefit, to extend"
年信, "year, to believe"
年伸, "year, to extend" 
年延, "year, to extend" 

The name can also be written in hiragana としのぶ or katakana トシノブ.

Notable people with the name
, Japanese footballer
, Japanese speed skater
, Japanese singer-songwriter, musician, music producer, and radio personality
, Japanese politician
Toshinobu Okumura (奥村 利信, birth and death unknown), Japanese ukiyo-e artist
Toshinobu Onosato (小野里 利信, 1912–1986), Japanese printmaker
, Japanese photographer

Japanese masculine given names